Glen Cavender (September 19, 1883 – February 9, 1962) was an American film actor.  He appeared in more than 250 films between 1914 and 1949.

Biography

Glen Cavender was born in Tucson, Arizona, and died in Hollywood, California. He started his acting career in vaudeville shows. Cavender belonged to the original Keystone Cops and was a regular in numerous Mack Sennett comedies. He also worked as a director for three Mack Sennett films between 1914 and 1916. During the 1920s, Cavender worked for the film studios Educational and Christie and appeared in Buster Keaton's film classic The General (1926) as the antagonistic Union Captain Anderson. The advance of sound film in the late 1920s damaged his career and, formerly a well-known actor, Cavender only played minor roles until his retirement in 1949.

Selected filmography

 Cruel, Cruel Love (1914, Short) - Bearded Doctor (uncredited)
 Dough and Dynamite (1914, Short) - Head Striking Baker
 Tillie's Punctured Romance (1914) - 1st Pianist in restaurant (uncredited)
 Mabel, Fatty and the Law (1915, Short) - Tobacco Counter Clerk (uncredited)
 Fatty's New Role (1915, Short) - Mustached Saloon Customer (uncredited)
 Fatty's Reckless Fling (1915, Short) - House Detective
 Fatty's Chance Acquaintance (1915, Short) - Waiter
 Fatty's Faithful Fido (1915, Short)
 That Little Band of Gold (1915, Short) - Judge (uncredited)
 Wished on Mabel (1915, Short) - Plainclothesman in Park
 Mabel's Wilful Way (1915, Short) - Mabel's Father
 Fatty's Tintype Tangle (1915, Short) - Man in Hotel Lobby (uncredited)
 Fickle Fatty's Fall (1915, Short) - Cook
 Fatty and the Broadway Stars (1915, Short) - Man Hit by Coat at Sennett's Office
 A Submarine Pirate (1915, Short) - A Shrewd Inventor / Ship Captain
 Fatty and Mabel Adrift (1916, Short) - I. Landem - Realtor
 The Rough House (1917, Short)
 The Pullman Bride (1917, Short) - The Pullman Waiter
 The Cook (1918, Short)
 The Sheriff (1918, Short)
 A Scrap of Paper (1918, Short) - The Kaiser
 Skirts (1921)
 Hearts of Youth (1921) - Reuben Grey
 Straight from the Shoulder (1921) - Pete
 Little Miss Hawkshaw (1921) - Sock Wolf
 What Love Will Do (1921) - Abner Rowan
 The Primal Law (1921) - Ruis
 Iron to Gold (1922) - Sloan
 The Pest (1922, Short) - The landlord
 No Wedding Bells (1923, Short) - An Irate Husband
 Our Alley (1923)
 Main Street (1923) - Harry Haydock
 The Man from Brodney's (1923) - Selim
 Pie-Eyed (1925, Short) - Nightclub manager
 The Iron Mule (1925, Short)
 The Snow Hawk (1925, Short) - Midnight Mike
 Navy Blue Days (1925, Short) - Pete Vermicelli
 The Sleuth (1925, Short) - The Husband
 Keep Smiling (1925) - Doublecrosser
 The Tourist (1925, short)
 Manhattan Madness (1925) - 'Broken Nose' Murphy
 The Movies (1925, Short) - A Traffic Officer
 The Fighting Dude (1925, Short) - The Athletic Instructor
 My Stars (1926, Short) - The Gardener
 Home Cured (1926, Short)
 His Private Life (1926, Short) - The Colonel
 The General (1926) - Union Captain Anderson
 Listen Lena (1927, Short)
 The Good-Bye Kiss (1928) - Minor Role (uncredited)
 Ships of the Night (1928) - Cramsey
 That's My Line (1931, Short) - Henchman
 The Nevada Buckaroo (1931) - Sheriff Hank

 Bengal Tiger (1936)
 Affectionately Yours (1941)

References

External links

1883 births
1962 deaths
American male film actors
American male silent film actors
Male actors from Tucson, Arizona
Burials at Forest Lawn Memorial Park (Glendale)
20th-century American male actors